Lutf Allah (d. c. 1357/58) was the leader of the Sarbadars of Sabzewar from 1356 until his death.

Life

Lutf Allah was the son of Wajih ad-Din Mas'ud, the second leader of the Sarbadars, and was considered by Mas'ud's adherents to be his legitimate successor. By the reign of Yahya Karawi he had come of age and Mas'ud's supporters were ready to install him as head of state. After the murder of Yahya in c. 1355 they attempted to seize control of the government. They were prevented from doing so by Haidar Qassāb, who drove them from Sabzewar and killed many of them. The remaining members of Mas'ud's party fled to Esfarayen, where Lutf Allah's atabeg Nasr Allah rebelled against the central government. The situation for Lutf Allah improved when Haidar Qassib was murdered on the orders of Hasan Damghani. Hasan then had Lutf Allah proclaimed as formal sovereign of the Sarbadars.

Lutf Allah's reign was short and consisted mostly of him acting as a figurehead for Hasan Damghani. During this time Astarabad was lost to Amir Vali. After a few years Lutf Allah got into a disagreement with Hasan Damghani, who deposed and executed him and then took formal control of the state. With Lutf Allah's death the party of Mas'ud was mostly broken.

Notes

References
Roemer, H. R. "The Jalayirids, Muzaffarids and Sarbadars." The Cambridge History of Iran Volume 6: The Timurid and Safavid Periods. Edited by Peter Jackson. New York: Cambridge University Press, 1986. 
Smith, Jr., John Masson. The History of the Sarbadar Dynasty 1336-1381 A.D. and Its Sources. The Hague: Mouton, 1970. 

Sarbadars

14th-century Iranian people
14th-century deaths

Year of birth unknown
Year of death uncertain